Dwight James Matthew McNeil (born 22 November 1999) is an English professional footballer who plays as a winger for Premier League club Everton. Born in England, McNeil is eligible to play for Jamaica through family heritage.

Club career

Early life

McNeil was born in Rochdale, Greater Manchester to parents Tracy and Matty McNeil, who was a professional footballer in the English Football League for Macclesfield Town and Stockport County. He has two younger siblings, Baillie and Chiara, and he attended the Oasis Academy in Oldham. He regularly watched his father play in non-league for Hyde United and first started playing football at the JJB Sports centre in Trafford. It was there that scouts from Bolton Wanderers pursued him for a trial, but after initial rejections from his parents, Bolton eventually got their way and he started training with them. At age five, he was offered the chance to join the academy at Manchester United, the club he supported as a child. He stayed in the United academy until the age of 14 when he started struggling for game time and was subsequently released.

Burnley
Within a week of his release, McNeil went on trial at the Burnley Academy. In July 2016, he was rewarded with a two-year scholarship and was a regular member of the under-18 squad and occasionally played for the Development Squad. In February 2018, he travelled with the first team squad for the Premier League game against Swansea City but failed to make the match-day squad. On 10 April 2018, following the end of his scholarship, he signed a professional two-year contract with the option of a third year in the club's favour. On 13 May 2018, he made his first team debut in the final match of the 2017–18 season when he replaced Aaron Lennon as a late substitute in the 2–1 home defeat to AFC Bournemouth. McNeil scored his first goal for the club in a 2–0 home win against West Ham United on 30 December 2018. On 16 October 2020, McNeil signed a new long-term contract at Burnley, keeping him at the club until 2024.

Everton 
On 28 July 2022, McNeil signed for Premier League club Everton on a five-year contract. Burnley and Everton came to an agreement for a transfer fee reportedly in the region of £20 million, including potential add-ons. On 6 August, McNeil made his debut for the club in a 1–0 loss against Chelsea in the Premier League. On 1 October 2022, McNeil scored his first goal for Everton in a 2–1 away win over Southampton.

International career
In March 2019, McNeil received his first call-up for the England U20s ahead of U20 Euro Elite League fixtures against Poland and Portugal. McNeil made his debut as a starter in a 3–1 defeat to Poland at St. George's Park. In May 2019, he was included in the U20 squad for the 2019 Toulon Tournament and scored his first international goal during the 4–0 victory over Guatemala on 11 June 2019.

On 30 August 2019, McNeil was included in the England U21 squad for the first time. He eventually made his U21 debut during a 2–2 draw against Slovenia in Maribor on 11 October 2019.

As well as England, McNeil is eligible to play for Jamaica as one of his father's parents was born in Jamaica.

Career statistics

References

External links

Profile at the Everton F.C. website

1999 births
Living people
Footballers from Rochdale
English footballers
Association football wingers
Burnley F.C. players
Everton F.C. players
Premier League players
England youth international footballers
England under-21 international footballers
English sportspeople of Jamaican descent